Clamoxyquine (INN) or clamoxyquin (former BAN), as the pamoate or hydrochloride salt, is an antiamebic and antidiarrheal drug.

It has been used as a veterinary medicine to treat salmonids for infection with the myxozoan parasite Myxobolus cerebralis.

Synthesis
Antimalarial activity also predominates in a quinoline that bears a diaminoalkyl side chain at a rather different position from the other agents noted. 

Thus, Mannich condensation of the hydroxyquinoline (1) with formaldehyde and N,N-diethylpropylenediamine affords clamoxyquin (2).

References

Veterinary drugs
Quinolines
Chloroarenes
Diethylamino compounds